Different Kinda Different is an album by American pop singer Johnny Mathis that was released on June 16, 1980, by Columbia Records and included covers of two standards ("Deep Purple", "Temptation") and two recent hits ("I Will Survive", "With You I'm Born Again"). It also continued the trend of recording duets with a female singer; for this project Paulette McWilliams (using the mononym Paulette) shared vocal duties on two of the six new songs.

The album was retitled All for You for its release in the UK, where it made it to number 20 during an eight-week run on the album chart that began the following month, on July 12. Different Kinda Different made its first appearance on Billboard magazine's Top LP's & Tapes chart in the issue dated August 9, 1980, and remained there for five weeks, peaking at number 164.

The title track from the album entered Billboard'''s list of the 100 most popular R&B songs in the US in the August 9 issue as well and got as high as number 81 during its four weeks there.

ReceptionBillboard wrote, "His vocals are elegantly fluid, and the two duets with Paulette are especially fine. Mathis does fine cover versions of 'With You I'm Born Again', 'Deep Purple', and 'I Will Survive'."

Track listing

Side one
 "Different Kinda Different"  performed with Paulette  (Marilyn McLeod, Pam Sawyer) – 3:25
 "With You I'm Born Again" from Fast Break (Carol Connors, David Shire) – 4:03
 "I'll Do It All for You" performed with Paulette  (Roger Cook, Steve Davis) – 3:29
 "Never Givin' Up on You" (Steve Dorff, Jack Gold, Gary Harju, Larry Herbstritt) – 3:15
 "Deep Purple" (Peter DeRose, Mitchell Parish) – 3:31

Side two
 "I Will Survive" (Dino Fekaris, Freddie Perren) – 3:59
 "Paradise" (Teddy Randazzo) – 3:07
 "The Lights of Rio" (Arnold Goland, Jack Gold) – 3:50
 "Love Without Words" (Sammy Cahn, John Lewis Parker) – 3:32
 "Temptation" from Going Hollywood (Nacio Herb Brown, Arthur Freed) – 3:14

For the All for You album in the UK, a cover of "Three Times a Lady" was inserted at the end of side one, but the order of the original 10 songs was unchanged. This additional track would make its US debut on Mathis's 1981 compilation The First 25 Years – The Silver Anniversary Album.

2017 CD bonus tracks
This album's CD release as part of the 2017 box set The Voice of Romance: The Columbia Original Album Collection included "Three Times a Lady" as one of five bonus tracks, the other four of which had not been available before:
"In Love with Love" (Jimmy Scott) – 3:19
"Time for Love" (Don Ferris, Jack Lloyd) – 4:23
"Wondering Why" (Ainsworth Prasad, Tamra Smith) – 3:38
"When Am I Going to Get Over You" (unknown) – 3:30
"Three Times a Lady" (Lionel Richie) – 4:15

Recording dates
From the liner notes for The Voice of Romance: The Columbia Original Album Collection:
July 18, 1979 – "Deep Purple"
November 27, 1979 – "In Love with Love", "Time for Love", "Wondering Why"
December 6, 1979 – "When Am I Going to Get Over You"
February 28, 1980 – "I'll Do It All for You", "Love Without Words", "Never Givin' Up on You"
March 5, 1980 – "I Will Survive", "Paradise", "Temptation"
April 7, 1980 – "Different Kinda Different", "The Lights of Rio", "Three Times a Lady", "With You I'm Born Again"

Song information

The Billy Preston-Syreeta duet "With You I'm Born Again" was written for the 1979 film Fast Break and reached number four on Billboard magazine's Hot 100, number two on its list of the 50 most popular Adult Contemporary songs in the US, number 86 on its R&B chart, and number two in the UK.  Larry Clinton & His Orchestra's recording of "Deep Purple" with Bea Wain on vocal spent nine weeks at number one in Billboard'' in 1939. "I Will Survive" by Gloria Gaynor lasted for three weeks at number one pop and four weeks in the top spot in the UK in addition to making it to number four R&B and number nine Adult Contemporary; the song also earned the Grammy Award for Best Disco Recording and Platinum certification from the Recording Industry Association of America. And Bing Crosby had the most successful version of the three different recordings of "Temptation" that charted early in 1934 when he peaked at number three.

Personnel
From the liner notes for the original album:
Johnny Mathis – vocals
Paulette McWilliams – vocals ("Different Kinda Different", "I'll Do It All for You")
Jack Gold – producer 
Gene Page – arranger, conductor (except as noted)
Victor Vanacore – arranger, conductor ("I Will Survive")
Dick Bogert – engineer
Jo-Anne Steinberg – production coordinator
David Vance – photographer
Nancy Donald – design
Gary Herbig – saxophone solo ("I'll Do It All for You")
Ernie Watts – saxophone solo ("Deep Purple")
Chris Bennett – carnival girl ("The Lights of Rio")
Mixed at  A&M Recording Studios, Hollywood, California

References

Bibliography

 

1980 albums
Johnny Mathis albums
Albums arranged by Gene Page
Columbia Records albums
Albums recorded at A&M Studios